Events from the year 1446 in Ireland.

Incumbent
Lord: Henry VI

Events
The construction of Blarney Castle is begun, near Cork

Births

Deaths

References

 
1440s in Ireland
Ireland
Years of the 15th century in Ireland